Communauté d'agglomération Dracénie Provence Verdon is an intercommunal structure, centred on the city of Draguignan. It is located in the Var department, in the Provence-Alpes-Côte d'Azur region, southeastern France. It was created in October 2000. Its seat is in Draguignan. Its area is 914.7 km2. Its population was 107,124 in 2017, of which 39,340 in Draguignan proper.

Composition
The communauté d'agglomération consists of the following 23 communes:

Ampus
Les Arcs
Bargème
Bargemon
La Bastide
Callas
Châteaudouble
Claviers
Comps-sur-Artuby
Draguignan
Figanières
Flayosc
Lorgues
Montferrat
La Motte
Le Muy
La Roque-Esclapon
Saint-Antonin-du-Var
Salernes
Sillans-la-Cascade
Taradeau
Trans-en-Provence
Vidauban

References

Dracenie Provence Verdon
Dracenie Provence Verdon